Kent Haden (born ) is an American politician. He is a member of the Missouri House of Representatives from the 43rd District, serving since 2019. He is a member of the Republican party.

Haden has twice proposed a bill to limit who can inspect farms in Missouri. His bill would mean that only state or federal agencies or the county sheriff could inspect facilities producing dairy products or raising livestock in the state. He first laid the bill in April 2019 but it died in the chamber. Haden laid the bill for a second time on 8 January 2020.

Electoral History

References

Living people
1950s births
Republican Party members of the Missouri House of Representatives
21st-century American politicians
People from Fulton, Missouri
People from Mexico, Missouri